David Herbert Lloyd (1899-1967) was the Archdeacon of St Davids from 1963 to his death.

Lloyd was  educated at St David's College, Lampeter. He was ordained deacon in 1922, and priest in 1923.  After curacies in Swansea and Tycroes he held incumbencies in Marloes, Fishguard, Llanbadarn Fawr and Prendergast.

References

Alumni of the University of Wales, Lampeter
Archdeacons of St Davids
Church in Wales archdeacons
20th-century Welsh Anglican priests